John Parr (20 December 1725, Dublin, Ireland – 25 November 1791, Halifax, Nova Scotia) was a British military officer and governor of Nova Scotia.  He is buried in the crypt of St. Paul's Church (Halifax).

Early life and military service
Parr was born in Dublin, Ireland as part of the Anglo-Irish aristocracy that had settled on the island during the 17th century and attended Trinity High School. At the age of 19 he joined the British Army's 20th Regiment of Foot as an ensign, and saw service in the War of the Austrian Succession.

A subaltern officer, he was with the Prince William, Duke of Cumberland and his army as it marched through Scotland against Charles Stuart's Jacobite rising at the Battle of Culloden in 1746.

In 1755 he became adjutant to James Wolfe, the colonel of the 20th Regiment of Foot. In 1759, during the Seven Years' War he was wounded at the Battle of Minden and spent six months in hospital. He was then stationed at Gibraltar for six years and purchased the rank of lieutenant colonel. In 1776, he resigned his regiment and, in 1778 he received a sinecure as major of the Tower of London.

Governor of Nova Scotia

He was offered the position of Governor of Nova Scotia and took up his position as the American Revolutionary War was coming to an end and United Empire Loyalists were fleeing north to escape persecution.

Parr arrived in Halifax with his family on 5 October 1782. His predecessor, Francis Legge had been an absentee governor for six years since being recalled to England and the colony had been under the stewardship of a succession of military lieutenant-governors.  The last of these was Sir Andrew Hamond, who had expected to be named governor himself. Angry at Parr's appointment, he resigned shortly after the new governor arrived and returned to England. Edmund Fanning, a recently arrived Loyalist, was named Parr's new lieutenant-governor. 

Parr immediately took over as colonel of the Royal Nova Scotia Volunteer Regiment.

In 1786, when the colonial administration of British North America was reorganized, Parr had hoped to be named to the new position of Governor-General of The Canadas and Governor-in-Chief of British North America but was disappointed when the position went to Guy Carleton, who was elevated to the peerage as Lord Dorchester. The position of Governor of Nova Scotia was thereby abolished and Parr was reappointed as lieutenant governor of the province with his superior being Lord Dorchester.

Parr's administration oversaw the settlement of Black Nova Scotians who were African-American Loyalists fleeing the United States. Parr was accused of "discriminatory practices and long delays" in the matter. He attempted to establish a whaling industry in Dartmouth (see Quaker Whaler House), and was embroiled in the "judges' affair" in which lawyers accused him of appointing incompetent or biased jurists to the bench.

Parr was under pressure to provide land and supplies for the new Loyalist settlers while not bankrupting the treasury.

The British government was inundated with complaints about the difficulties the Loyalists were facing and Parr's allegedly unsympathetic attitude towards them. The stress of the position may have taken a toll on his health, he died in office at the age of 66.  He funeral was with full military honours, presided over by the 20th Foot.  Parr was interred in Halifax's St. Paul's Church.

Legacy 
namesake of Parrsboro, Nova Scotia
 namesake of Parr St., Saint Andrews, New Brunswick

References
History of the XX Regiment
Historical biographies: John Parr
Memoirs of John Parr by James S. MacDonald

Blupete Biography 
Parr report

1725 births
1791 deaths
Governors of the Colony of Nova Scotia
British Army personnel of the War of the Austrian Succession
British Army personnel of the Seven Years' War
British Army personnel of the Jacobite rising of 1745
Lancashire Fusiliers officers
Military personnel from Dublin (city)